8-Hydroxyguanosine is an RNA nucleoside which is an oxidative derivative of guanosine.  Measurement of the levels of 8-hydroxyguanosine is used as a biomarker of oxidative stress causing RNA damage.

See also
 8-Oxo-2'-deoxyguanosine

References

Nucleosides
Purines
Biomarkers